ORP Warszawa was an armed river monitor of the Riverine Flotilla of the Polish Navy, launched in 1920 and scuttled in 1939. She was raised by the Soviets, scuttled again in 1941, raised for the last time in 1944 and then scrapped.

Construction
Warszawa was built in 1920 in the Free City of Danzig for the Polish Navy. Initially she was armed with two 105 mm guns and five machine guns, and by the late 1930s she carried three 75 mm guns and four machine guns.

Invasion of Poland
Like all of the ships of the Riverine Flotilla of the Polish Navy in Pinsk, she was not used in combat during the German Invasion of Poland. After the Soviet invasion of Poland, she was scuttled on the Pripyat River on 18 September 1939, because of the impossibility of withdrawal.

Soviet service
She was raised on 11 October 1939 by the Soviets, towed to Factory No 300 in Kiev, repaired and commissioned as Vitebsk (Витебск). She served in the Dnepr Flotilla, then the Pinsk Flotilla. From July 1941 she fought against the Germans on the Berezina, Desna and Dnieper Rivers, in the defence of Kiev. Because of the Soviet retreat, she was scuttled on 18 September 1941 near Kiev.

Fate
The wreck was raised in August 1944 by the Soviets, and then scrapped at Kiev.

References 

 S.S. Berezhnoy, Trofyei i reparacyi VMF SSSR, Yakutsk 1994

Ships of the Polish Navy
World War II monitors
Captured ships
World War II naval ships of Poland
Maritime incidents in September 1939
Maritime incidents in September 1941
Riverine warfare
Shipwrecks of Poland